Events from the year 1974 in Canada.

Incumbents

Crown 
 Monarch – Elizabeth II

Federal government 
 Governor General – Roland Michener (until January 14), then Jules Léger
 Prime Minister – Pierre Trudeau
 Chief Justice – Gérald Fauteux (until January 7), then Bora Laskin
 Parliament – 29th (until 9 May) then 30th (from 30 September)

Provincial governments

Lieutenant governors 
Lieutenant Governor of Alberta – Grant MacEwan (until July 2) then Ralph Steinhauer
Lieutenant Governor of British Columbia – Walter Stewart Owen 
Lieutenant Governor of Manitoba – William John McKeag 
Lieutenant Governor of New Brunswick – Hédard Robichaud
Lieutenant Governor of Newfoundland – Ewart John Arlington Harnum (until July 2) then Gordon Arnaud Winter 
Lieutenant Governor of Nova Scotia – Clarence Gosse
Lieutenant Governor of Ontario – William Ross Macdonald (until April 10) then Pauline Mills McGibbon
Lieutenant Governor of Prince Edward Island – John George MacKay (until October 21) then Gordon Lockhart Bennett (from October 24)
Lieutenant Governor of Quebec – Hugues Lapointe 
Lieutenant Governor of Saskatchewan – Stephen Worobetz

Premiers 
Premier of Alberta – Peter Lougheed
Premier of British Columbia – Dave Barrett
Premier of Manitoba – Edward Schreyer
Premier of New Brunswick – Richard Hatfield
Premier of Newfoundland – Frank Moores
Premier of Nova Scotia – Gerald Regan
Premier of Ontario – Bill Davis 
Premier of Prince Edward Island – Alexander B. Campbell 
Premier of Quebec – Robert Bourassa 
Premier of Saskatchewan – Allan Blakeney

Territorial governments

Commissioners 
 Commissioner of Yukon – James Smith 
 Commissioner of Northwest Territories – Stuart Milton Hodgson

Events
January 1
Maurice Nadon is appointed as the 16th commissioner of the Royal Canadian Mounted Police (RCMP), becoming the first French Canadian to hold the post.
The Canadian Stock Exchange merges with the Montreal Stock Exchange, with the merged entity operating under the latter name.
Woodsworth College at the University of Toronto is founded, formally integrating part-time degree students into the University.
January 6 – Global Television becomes Canada's third English-language television network when it begins broadcasting in southern Ontario.
January 7 – Bora Laskin is sworn in as the 14th chief justice of Canada to replace the retiring Gérald Fauteux. In appointing Laskin, Prime Minister Trudeau breaks with tradition by passing over the more senior justice, Ronald Martland.
January 14 – Jules Léger is sworn in as the 21st governor general of Canada, succeeding the retiring Roland Michener.
January 15 – The Knight Street Bridge opens, joining Vancouver and Richmond, British Columbia.
January 17 – Pauline McGibbon of Ontario becomes the first female lieutenant governor of a province.
March 13 – A treaty between Canada and Denmark is ratified, establishing the maritime border between Ellesmere Island (Canada) and Greenland (Denmark). However, the boundary line has a gap around Hans Island, with both nations claiming sovereignty.
April 3 – A tornado strikes Windsor, Ontario, killing 9 people. The tornado was part of the 1974 Super Outbreak.
May 23
New Brunswick becomes the first province to be officially bilingual.
The RCMP accepts applications from women for regular police duties for the first time. The first 32 women formed Troop 17, were sworn in on September 16, 1974, and graduated on March 3, 1975. Beverly Busson, a member of Troop 17, became the first female RCMP commissioner on December 16, 2006.
June 29 – Soviet ballet dancer Mikhail Baryshnikov defects in Toronto.
July 2 – Ralph Steinhauer becomes the first Aboriginal person to be a lieutenant governor when he is appointed lieutenant governor of Alberta.
Vote of no-confidence in parliament forces election.
July 8 – Federal election: Pierre Trudeau's Liberals win a majority.
July 31 – Bill 22 is passed making French the official language of government and business in Quebec.
August 1 – The Elections Act is passed, limiting campaign contributions.
August 9 – Nine Canadians are killed when Buffalo 461 is shot down during a peacekeeping mission in Syria.
September 1 - CFVO-TV commences Broadcasting but later gains a regional scandal.
November 29 – An aircraft is hijacked over Saskatchewan. It is recovered in Saskatoon.

Full date unknown
Dorothea Crittenden of Ontario becomes Canada's first female deputy minister, Ministry of Community & Social Services.
Paul Joseph Martin made president of Canada Steamship Lines.
The Waffle disbands.
The report of the Le Dain Commission argues marijuana should be decriminalized.
Robert Cliche chairs a Royal Commission investigating corruption in Quebec's construction industry. Brian Mulroney, later to become prime minister, first comes to national attention as a panelist on the commission.

Arts and literature

New works
bill bissett – Living with the 
Irving Layton – The Pole-Vaulter
Margaret Atwood – You Are Happy
Alice Munro – Something I've Been Meaning to Tell You
Margaret Laurence – The Diviners

Awards
See 1974 Governor General's Awards for a complete list of winners and finalists for those awards.
Stephen Leacock Award: Donald Jack, That's Me in the Middle
Vicky Metcalf Award: Jean Little

Sport 
March 16 – The Waterloo Warriors win their first University Cup by defeating the Sir George Williams Georgians, 6 to 5. The final game was played at Maple Leaf Gardens in Toronto.
May 12 – The Regina Pats win their fourth Memorial Cup by defeating the Quebec Remparts, 7 to 4. The final game is played at the Stampede Corral in Calgary.
May 19 – Montreal's Bernie Parent of the Philadelphia Flyers is awarded the Conn Smythe Trophy.
September 22 – Brazilian Emerson Fittipaldi wins the Canadian Grand Prix at Mosport Park in Bowmanville, Ontario.
November 21 – The Western Ontario Mustangs win their second Vanier Cup by defeating the Toronto Varsity Blues by a score of 19–15.
November 24 – The Montreal Alouettes win their third Grey Cup by defeating the Edmonton Eskimos, 20 to 7. The 62nd Grey Cup was played at Empire Stadium in Vancouver. Montreal's Don Sweet won the game's Most Valuable Player award and Edmonton's Don Barker won the game's Most Valuable Canadian award.

Births

January to March
January 14 – Hugues Legault, swimmer
January 19 – Diane Cummins, middle-distance runner
January 21 – Robert Ghiz, politician and 31st Premier of Prince Edward Island
January 23 – Joel Bouchard, ice hockey player
January 24 – Kristy Sargeant, pair skater
January 25 – Robert Budreau, director, producer, and screenwriter
January 29 – Kris Burley, artistic gymnast
January 31 – Anna Silk, actress
February 7 – Steve Nash, basketball player
February 21 – Mary Fuzesi, rhythmic gymnast
March 20 – Kevin Sullivan, runner and coach

April to June
April 11 – Tricia Helfer, model and actress
April 26 – Jacinthe Pineau, swimmer
May 9 – Stéphane Yelle, Canadian ice hockey player
May 10 – Jon Beare, rower and Olympic bronze medalist
May 16 – Yannick Keith Lizé, water polo player and scientist
May 18 – Chantal Kreviazuk, singer-songwriter
May 18 – Carolyn Russell, squash player
June 1 – Alanis Morissette, singer-songwriter, record producer and actress
June 6 – Anson Carter, ice hockey player
June 9 – Jackie Lance, softball player

July to September
July 4 -Kevin Hanchard actor
July 6 – Steve Sullivan, ice hockey player
July 7 – Patrick Lalime, ice hockey player
July 13 – Deborah Cox, singer-songwriter and actress
July 26 - Daniel Negreanu poker player 
August 9 – Mara Jones, rower
August 15 – Natasha Henstridge, actress and model
September 6 - Sarah Strange actress and voice actress
September 8 – Becky Price, field hockey player
September 18 – Nicole Haynes, heptathlete
September 28 – Alison Parrott, murder victim (d. 1986)

October to December
October 6 – Madonna Gimotea, rhythmic gymnast
October 10 – Chris Pronger, ice hockey player
October 11 – Jason Arnott, ice hockey player
October 16 – Paul Kariya, ice hockey player
October 22 – Paul Duerden, volleyball player
November 4 – Amy MacFarlane, field hockey player
November 10 - Michael Greenspan filmmaker and writer 
November 15 - Chad Kroeger singer
November 21 – Casey Patton, boxer
November 22 – David Pelletier, pair skater
November 25 – David Cadieux, boxer
December 7 - Nicole Appleton singer

Deaths
February 21 – Tim Horton, ice hockey player and businessman (b.1930)
February 28 – Harold Sherk, Mennonite minister and peace activist (b.1903)
April 2 – Douglass Dumbrille, actor (b.1889)
April 5 – A. Y. Jackson, painter, one of the Group of Seven (b.1882)
April 8 – James Charles McGuigan, Cardinal (b.1894)
June 21 - Merton Yarwood Williams, geologist and academic (b.1883)
August 25 – Major James Coldwell, politician (b.1888)

See also
 1974 in Canadian television
 List of Canadian films of 1974

References

 
Years of the 20th century in Canada
Canada
1974 in North America